In 2021, Wind power in Vermont consisted of five utility-scale wind farms with a total capacity of 149 megawatts (MW). They were responsible for one-sixth of in-state electricity generation in 2019.

No other wind farms are in the pipeline as of January 2020.

The first megawatt turbine in the world was installed in Vermont, at Grandpa's Knob in 1941.

Wind farms

The 6 MW Searsburg Wind Farm has operated since 1997. The 550-kilowatt turbines provide enough electricity to meet the needs of 1,600 average Vermont households.

Sheffield Wind Farm is a 40 MW wind farm operating in Sheffield originally developed by First Wind and currently owned by TerraForm Power.

The 63 MW Kingdom Community Wind Farm is operational on Lowell Mountains ridge in Lowell, owned by Green Mountain Power (GMP) and Vermont Electric Co-op (VEC).
Costing $156 million, 
the 21-turbine project began construction in September 2011, with completion expected by the end of 2012.

Georgia Mountain Community Wind Project is a 4-turbine, 10-megawatt wind project on Georgia Mountain in the towns of Georgia and Milton.  It is owned by a Vermont family and the power is being sold to the Burlington Electric Department.  It was completed in December 2012.  The project’s 4 wind turbines will provide enough electricity to meet the needs of 4,200 average Vermont households.

Small wind turbines
Several 100 kW wind turbines manufactured by a Vermont company have been installed or planned at locations in the state, including Heritage Aviation, Bolton Ski Area, Dynapower, Rock of Ages, Burke Mountain, and the Lake Champlain Ferry at South Hero. Smaller wind turbines for residential use are also located throughout Vermont.

Generation

Proposals
The 30 MW Deerfield Wind Project is a proposed wind farm set to be located in Searsburg and Readsboro, and to include 15 turbines. It is estimated to provide enough electricity to meet the needs of 13,000 average Vermont households, and that it will create approximately 250 jobs during its construction and 9 when it starts operating. It is expected to contribute $10 million in state Education Fund revenues over its 20-year life.

See also
Solar power in Vermont
Smith–Putnam wind turbine
Wind power in the United States
Renewable energy in the United States

References

External links 

Google Map of alternative energy and nuclear sites, including wind, in New England